Fernando Silvestre Mandlate (born 11 August 1985) is a Mozambique basketball player currently with Maxaquene of the Mozambique Professional Basketball League. He is also a member of the Mozambique national basketball team and appeared with the club at the 2005, 2007 and 2009 African Championships.

References

1985 births
Living people
Mozambican men's basketball players
African Games silver medalists for Mozambique
African Games medalists in basketball
Competitors at the 2011 All-Africa Games